Norman Gagne (3 January 1911 – 28 November 1986) was a Canadian ski jumper. He competed in the individual event at the 1936 Winter Olympics.

References

External links
 

1911 births
1986 deaths
Canadian male ski jumpers
Olympic ski jumpers of Canada
Ski jumpers at the 1936 Winter Olympics
Skiers from Montreal